Michail Elgin and Nikolaus Moser were the defending champions, but they chose to not compete together this time.
Moser played with Alexander Peya. They lost to Andis Juška and Alexey Kedryuk in the quarterfinals.
Elgin partnered with Alexandre Kudryavtsev and they reached the final, but lost 3–6, 6–7(10) to Colin Fleming and Ross Hutchins.

Seeds

Draw

Draw

External links
 Main Draw

President's Cup (second edition) - Doubles
2010 Doubles